Whyte is a surname and an older English spelling of White, and may refer to:

 Alain Whyte, an English guitarist, singer, and songwriter
 Alexander Whyte, was a Scottish divine. He was born at Kirriemuir in Forfarshire in Scotland
 Sir Alexander Frederick Whyte, (1883–1970) British politician
 Alison Whyte, a Tasmanian-born Australian actress
 Angela Whyte, Canadian athlete
 Archie Whyte, Scottish footballer
 Arthur Mornington Whyte (1921–2014), South Australian politician
 Chris Whyte, English footballer (Leeds United AFC)
 Christopher Whyte (writer), Scottish writer
 Craig Whyte, Scottish businessman  (Rangers FC)
 David Whyte (footballer), English footballer
 Derek Whyte, Scottish footballer (Celtic FC, Middlesbrough FC, Aberdeen FC and Partick Thistle FC)
 Dillian Whyte, professional boxer
 Edna Gardner Whyte (1902–1992) American aviator
 Frederick Methvan Whyte, a USA mechanical engineer of Dutch background, inventor of the Whyte notation for steam locomotives
 George Whyte-Melville, Scottish novelist of the sporting-field and a poet
 Graham Whyte, engineer 
 Heather Stewart-Whyte (born 25 September 1968), a British model
 Hugh Whyte (1955–2009), Scottish footballer (Dunfermline Athletic FC)
 Hugh F. Durrant-Whyte, known for his pioneering work on probabilistic methods for robotics
 Ian Whyte (disambiguation), multiple people
 Ibubeleye Whyte, Nigerian footballer
 Jack Whyte, a Scottish-Canadian novelist of historical fiction
 James Whyte (disambiguation), multiple people
 Jamie Whyte, New Zealand political party leader
 Jim Whyte (footballer), Scottish footballer
 Joe Whyte, Sports Podcaster (KTD Sports)
 John Whyte (disambiguation), multiple people
 Kathleen Whyte (1909–1996), Scottish embroiderer and teacher of textile arts
 Kenneth Whyte, a Canadian newspaper and magazine editor
 Kerrith Whyte Jr. (born 1996), American football player
 Kye Whyte (born 1999), British BMX racer
 Lancelot Law Whyte, a Scottish financier and industrial engineer
 Louis Whyte, an Australian sportsman
 Malcolm Whyte, American author, editor, publisher, and founder of the Cartoon Art Museum in San Francisco
 Margaret Whyte (born 1940), Uruguayan artist
 Pat Whyte, West Indian cricket umpire
 Peter Whyte, Australian rules footballer
 Peter and Catharine Whyte, Canadian/American painters and philanthropists
Philip Whyte, Scottish footballer
 Ron Whyte (1941–1989), was an American playwright, critic, and disability-rights activist
 Ronald M. Whyte, United States federal judge
 Rosemarie Whyte, Jamaican athlete
 Rowland Whyte, Elizabethan English letter writer.
 Scott Whyte, an American actor who is best known for his role on City Guys
 Sean Whyte (Canadian football), Canadian football player
 Sean Whyte (ice hockey), Canadian hockey player
 Steven Whyte, English sculptor
 Thomas Whyte (academic), 16th century Oxford academic
 William Whyte (disambiguation), multiple people
 Zack Whyte, American jazz bandleader

English-language surnames
Scottish surnames
Surnames of English origin
Surnames of Scottish origin
Anglicised Scottish Gaelic-language surnames